Richard Edward Werner (born December 2, 1957) is an American politician and a Republican former member of the South Dakota House of Representatives representing District 22 from 2013 until 2017.

Education, Life
Werner graduated from the University of South Dakota. Werner is a Member of the Local Lions Chapter in Huron.

Elections
2012 When incumbent Republican Representative Jim White ran for South Dakota Senate and left a District 22 seat open, Werner ran in the three-way June 5, 2012 Republican Primary and placed first by 1 vote with 725 votes; in the four-way November 6, 2012 General election, incumbent Democratic Representative Peggy Gibson took the first seat and Werner took the second seat with 4,344 votes (25.05%) ahead of Democratic nominee Dale Hargens and fellow Republican nominee Jay Slater.

References

External links
Official page at the South Dakota Legislature
 

Living people
Republican Party members of the South Dakota House of Representatives
People from Huron, South Dakota
People from Campbell County, South Dakota
University of South Dakota alumni
1957 births
21st-century American politicians